Spiro Jorgo (Gogo) Koleka (1879 or 1880–1940) was an Albanian politician active in the 1920s.

Life
Born in the village of Vuno, near Himara, he was one of the leaders of the Albanian exiles in Greece that planned to invade southern Albania, at the time being under Greek control, while other leaders such as Sotir Petzigat Brindisi and Mustafa Kruja were in Vienna.

Later Koleka was an important representative at the Congress of Lushnjë (28–31 January 1920) and was responsible for implementing many of its decisions. Koleka also played a key role as an organiser in the Vlora War against the Italians (June–September 1920). He was the Albanian government representative concerning the Himara question in 1921. He served as Minister of Public Works in 1922 and 1924, respectively in the cabinets of Ahmet Zogolli and Shefqet Vërlaci.

Annotations
Name: Spiro J. Koleka, Spiro G. Koleka, Spiro Kolleka.

References

Sources

External links

19th-century births
1940 deaths
People from Himara
19th-century Albanian people
20th-century Albanian people
Members of the Parliament of Albania
Government ministers of Albania
Public Works ministers of Albania
Ministers without portfolio of Albania
People from Janina vilayet